

Baintha Brakk or The Ogre is a steep, craggy mountain,  high, in the Panmah Muztagh, a subrange of the Karakoram mountain range. It is located in Gilgit-Baltistan, Pakistan. It is famous for being one of the hardest peaks in the world to climb: twenty-four years elapsed between the first ascent in 1977 and the second in 2001.

Location 
Baintha Brakk rises above the north side of the Biafo Glacier, one of the major glaciers of the central Karakoram.

Notable features 
Baintha Brakk is exceptional in its combination of altitude, height above local terrain, and steepness. It is a complex granite tower, steeper and rockier than most other Karakoram peaks. (The Latok peaks next to Baintha Brakk are similar, however.)

It is because of this steep, rocky nature that Baintha Brakk has been both so difficult to climb and so attractive a target for extremely high-level mountaineers.

Climbing history 
Following two unsuccessful attempts in 1971 and 1976, the peak was first climbed by two Britons, Doug Scott and Chris Bonington, in 1977. (The other members of the party were Mo Anthoine, Clive Rowland, Nick Estcourt, and Tut Braithwaite. Estcourt, Anthoine, and Rowland all reached the lower West Summit, while Braithwaite was injured early on by rockfall.) They climbed via the Southwest Spur to the West Ridge, and over the West Summit to the Main Summit.

The descent proved more dangerous still: On the first rappel from the summit, Scott broke both legs.
Later, Bonington broke two ribs and contracted pneumonia. Also, much of the week-long descent to base camp was in a major storm. However, they were all able to reach base camp, where they had a long wait for assistance.

The second ascent of Baintha Brakk was made by Urs Stöcker, Iwan Wolf, and Thomas Huber, on 21 July 2001, via the South Pillar route, following their first ascent of the subsidiary peak Ogre III (circa ). They note that there were more than 20 unsuccessful expeditions in the interim. Mountain INFO magazine characterized their ascent as "arguably the most notable mountaineering achievement during the entire 2001 season."

A third ascent by a new line on the peak's South Face was made by Americans Kyle Dempster and Hayden Kennedy on August 21, 2012. Compatriot Josh Wharton had also accompanied them on the climb but had to abandon the attempt at approximately  due to altitude sickness. Earlier in their trip the two had made another first ascent (along with Slovenian Urban Novak) of a new line on the massive east face of K7.

See also 
 List of mountains in Pakistan
 List of Ultras of the Karakoram and Hindu Kush

References 

 Jill Neate, High Asia: An Illustrated History of the 7000 Metre Peaks, .

External links 
 

Seven-thousanders of the Karakoram
Mountains of Gilgit-Baltistan